Baïssama Mohamed Sankoh (born 20 March 1992) is a Guinean professional footballer who plays for Cypriot club Nea Salamina and the Guinea national team.

Club career
Born in Nogent-sur-Marne, France, Sankoh made his Ligue 2 debut during the 2011–12 season for EA Guingamp.

He joined Brest on loan for the 2015–16 season. For Brest, he mostly played in midfield, instead of his accustomed full-back position.

On 3 July 2017, he joined French side SM Caen on a three-year contract. He remained in the club until 1 February 2020, day where he left the club remaining free agent.

On 23 February 2020, he joined the Italian side Ascoli. The contract is until the end of the 2019–20 season, with the club holding an option to renew it for two additional seasons.

International career
Sankoh was called up by the coach Michel Dussuyer in the Guinean squad for a friendly against Congo DR on 1 June 2013, and for the 2014 World Cup preliminaries against Mozambique and Zimbabwe.

He played with the national team in 2015 Africa Cup of Nations, where the team reached the quarter-finals.

Honours
Guingamp
 Coupe de France: 2013–14

References

External links
 
 
 

1992 births
Living people
Sportspeople from Nogent-sur-Marne
Citizens of Guinea through descent
Guinean footballers
French footballers
Guinea international footballers
2015 Africa Cup of Nations players
2019 Africa Cup of Nations players
French sportspeople of Guinean descent
Association football fullbacks
En Avant Guingamp players
Stade Brestois 29 players
Stade Malherbe Caen players
Ascoli Calcio 1898 F.C. players
Nea Salamis Famagusta FC players
Ligue 1 players
Ligue 2 players
Cypriot First Division players
Guinean expatriate footballers
Guinean expatriate sportspeople in Italy
Expatriate footballers in Italy
Guinean expatriate sportspeople in Cyprus
Expatriate footballers in Cyprus
Footballers from Val-de-Marne
Black French sportspeople